AR Aurigae (AR Aur), also known by its Flamsteed designation 17 Aurigae, is a binary star in the constellation Auriga. Based on parallax measurements made by the Hipparcos spacecraft, it is approximately 461 light-years from Earth.

Both components are blue-white B-type main-sequence stars that do not fill their Roche lobes. The system has a mean apparent magnitude of +6.15. However, the orbit of the stars are oriented in such a way that they periodically eclipse each other, so AR Aurigae is a variable star and its brightness varies from magnitude +6.15 to +6.82 with a period of 4.13 days.

The primary component of AR Aurigae is known to be a mercury-manganese star, also known as an HgMn star. As the name implies, these stars have over-abundances of the elements mercury and manganese, and also often xenon and other elements. Because AR Aurigae is an eclipsing binary (in fact, it is the only known eclipsing binary with a mercury-manganese star), accurate characterization of its parameters has been made possible.

References

External links
 HR 1728
 Image AR Aurigae

034364
024740
1728
Durchmusterung objects
Auriga (constellation)
B-type main-sequence stars
Algol variables
Mercury-manganese stars
Aurigae, AR
Aurigae, 17